This is a list of productions from Blue Sky Studios, a former American computer-animation film production company based in Greenwich, Connecticut, United States, including feature films, shorts, specials, and television series. Blue Sky had released 13 feature films, which were all released by 20th Century Fox (now 20th Century Studios) before its closure on April 10, 2021. The company produced its first feature-length film, Ice Age, in 2002. Their second production, Robots, was released in 2005, followed by their first sequel, Ice Age: The Meltdown, in 2006.

Blue Sky Studios was one of the Fox film studios that was acquired by Disney on March 20, 2019.

Blue Sky's final film was Spies in Disguise, which was released on December 25, 2019. The studio's final production overall was the miniseries Ice Age: Scrat Tales, released on April 13, 2022.

Feature films 
{| class="wikitable sortable" style="text-align:center; margin=auto; width:100%;"
! rowspan="2" width="15%" | Film
! rowspan="2" width="10%" | Release date
! rowspan="2" | Director(s)
! rowspan="2" | Co-director(s)
! colspan="2" width="25%" | Writer(s)
! rowspan="2" width="10%" | Producer(s)
! rowspan="2" width="10%" | Executive Producer(s)
! rowspan="2" width="10%" | Editor(s)
! rowspan="2" | Composer(s)
! rowspan="2" width="10%" | Co-production with
|-
! width="15%" | Story
! width="15%" | Screenplay
|-
| Ice Age
| March 15, 2002
| rowspan="2" | Chris Wedge
| rowspan="2" | Carlos Saldanha
| Michael J. Wilson
| Peter Ackerman, Michael Berg & Wilson
| Lori Forte
| rowspan="2" | Chris Meledandri
| rowspan="2" | John Carnochan
| David Newman
| rowspan="11" | 20th Century Fox Animation
|-
| Robots
| March 11, 2005
| David Lindsay-Abaire, Jim McClain & Ron Mita
| Lowell Ganz, Lindsay-Abaire & Babaloo Mandel
| Jerry Davis, John C. Donkin & William Joyce
| rowspan="6" | John Powell
|-
| Ice Age: The Meltdown
| March 31, 2006
| Carlos Saldanha
| rowspan="2" 
| Peter Gaulke & Gerry Swallow
| Gaulke, Jim Hecht & Swallow
| Lori Forte
| Chris Meledandri & Chris Wedge
| Harry Hitner
|-
| Horton Hears a Who!
| March 14, 2008
| Jimmy Hayward & Steve Martino
| Dr. SeussBased on Horton Hears a Who!
| Ken Daurio & Cinco Paul
| Bruce Anderson & Bob Gordon
| Chris Meledandri, Chris Wedge & Audrey Geisel
| Tim Nordquist
|-
| Ice Age: Dawn of the Dinosaurs
| July 1, 2009
| rowspan="2" | Carlos Saldanha
| Mike Thurmeier
| Jason Carter Eaton
| Peter Ackerman, Michael Berg, Yoni Brenner & Mike Reiss
| John C. Donkin & Lori Forte
| rowspan="2" | Chris Wedge
| rowspan="2" | Harry Hitner
|-
| Rio
| April 15, 2011
| rowspan="5" 
| Earl Richey Jones, Todd Jones & Saldanha
| Sam Harper, Don Rhymer, Joshua Sternin & Jeffrey Ventimilia
| Bruce Anderson & John C. Donkin
|-
| Ice Age: Continental Drift
| July 13, 2012
| Steve Martino & Mike Thurmeier
| Michael Berg & Lori Forte
| Berg & Jason Fuchs
| John C. Donkin & Forte
| Carlos Saldanha & Chris Wedge
| James M. Palumbo & David Ian Salter
|-
| Epic
| May 24, 2013
| Chris Wedge
| James V. Hart, William Joyce & Wedge   Based on The Leafmen and the Brave Good Bugs 
| Tom J. Astle, Matt Ember, Hart, Joyce & Daniel Shere
| Jerry Davis & Lori Forte
| Joyce & Hart
| Andy Keir
| Danny Elfman
|-
| Rio 2
| April 11, 2014
| Carlos Saldanha
| Saldanha
| Jenny Bicks, Yoni Brenner, Carlos Kotkin & Don Rhymer
| Bruce Anderson & John C. Donkin
| Chris Wedge
| Harry Hitner
| John Powell
|-
| The Peanuts Movie
| November 6, 2015
| Steve Martino
| Charles M. Schulz  <small> Based on Peanuts </small>
| Craig Schulz, Bryan Schulz & Cornelius Uliano
| Paul Feig, C., B. Schulz, Michael J. Travers & Uliano
| Craig Schulz & Bryan Schulz
| Randy Trager
| Christophe Beck
|-
| Ice Age: Collision Course| July 22, 2016
| Mike Thurmeier
| Galen T. Chu
| Aubrey Solomon
| Michael Berg, Yoni Brenner & Michael J. Wilson
| Lori Forte
| Carlos Saldanha & Chris Wedge
| James M. Palumbo
| John Debney
|-
| Ferdinand| December 15, 2017
| Carlos Saldanha
| rowspan="2" 
|    Based on The Story of Ferdinand 
| Robert L. Baird, Brad Copeland & Tim Federle
| Bruce Anderson, John Davis, Lori Forte & Lisa Marie Stetler
| Chris Wedge
| Harry Hitner
| John Powell
| 20th Century Fox AnimationDavis Entertainment
|-
|Spies in Disguise| December 25, 2019
| Nick Bruno & Troy Quane
|    Based on Pigeon Impossible 
| Brad Copeland & Lloyd Taylor
| Peter Chernin, Jenno Topping & Michael J. Travers
| Chris Wedge & Kori Adelson
| Randy Trager & Christopher Campbell
| Theodore Shapiro
| 20th Century Fox AnimationChernin Entertainment
|}

 Television specials 

 Short films 

 Television series 

 Contributions 
 Joe's Apartment (1996) – dancing and singing cockroaches
 Alien Resurrection (1997) – the aliens
 A Simple Wish (1997) – numerous characters and special effects
 Mouse Hunt (1997) – several mice and household effects
 Star Trek: Insurrection (1998) – several alien creatures
 Jesus' Son (1999) – sacred heart, "liquid" glass, and screaming cotton ball effects
 Fight Club (1999) – the "sliding" penguin
 The Sopranos (2000) – the "talking fish" in the episode "Funhouse"
 Titan A.E. (2000) – 3D animation: creation of the new world in the final "Genesis" sequence
 Family Guy'' (2006) – Scrat's cameo in the episode "Sibling Rivalry"

Commercials 

 Braun "The Last Word" (1992) 
 Nicktoons "3-D Laughing Boy Open" (1993)
 Chock full o'Nuts "Complements / Weddings" (1993)
 Nestlé "Cookie Jar" (1993)
 Berry Berry Kix "Recliner Boy" (1994)
 M&M's "Celebrity Campaign" (1994)
 Brother "Glitches" (1994)
 Cheerios "Little O, Big Taste" (1995)
 Clamato "Skaters" (1995)
 Mopar (1996)
 Honey-Comb (1996)
 Bell Atlantic "The Big Deal" (1996)
 Pepsi "Swingers" (1996)
 Rayovac "Fierce Creatures / Super Stomper" (1997)
 Capri Sun "Waterspout" (1997)
 Mannington Floors "Mosaics" (1997)
 Hostess "The Last Doughnut" (1998)
 Tennent's Lager "Re-Incarnated" (1998)
 Mott's "Fruitsations" (1998)
 Target Toys "Big Adventure / Dog & Robota" (1998)
 Nature's Resource "St. John's Wort / Ginko / Echinacea" (1998)
 Blockbuster Video (1998)
 Starburst "Tunnel" (1999)
 Rice Krispies "Proud Parent" (1999)
 20th Century Fox (2009)

Related productions

Cancelled films

Reception

Critical and public reception

Box office performance

Accolades

Academy Award wins and nominations

Annie Awards wins and nominations

Golden Globes Award wins and nominations

See also 
 20th Century Animation § Co-productions and original films
 List of computer-animated films
 List of Walt Disney Animation Studios films
 List of Pixar films
 List of 20th Century Studios theatrical animated features
 List of Disney theatrical animated features
 List of unproduced 20th Century Studios animated projects

References 

Lists of films by studio
American films by studio